Astra is the brand name for a number of geostationary communication satellites, both individually and as a group, which are owned and operated by SES S.A., a global satellite operator based in Betzdorf, in eastern Luxembourg. The name is also used to describe the pan-European broadcasting system provided by these satellites, the channels carried on them, and even the reception equipment.

At the time of the launch of the first Astra satellite, Astra 1A in 1988, the satellite's operator was known as Société Européenne des Satellites. In 2001 SES Astra, a newly formed subsidiary of SES, operated the Astra satellites and in September 2011, SES Astra was consolidated back into the parent company, which by this time also operated other satellite families such as AMC, and NSS.

Astra satellites broadcast 2,600 digital television channels (675 in high definition) via five main satellite orbital positions to households across Asia, Australia, Africa, Americas, Europe, New Zealand, Middle East and North Africa. The satellites have been instrumental in the establishment of satellite TV and the introduction of digital TV, HDTV, 3D TV, and Hybrid Broadcast Broadband TV (HbbTV) in Europe.

A book, High Above, telling the story of the creation and development of the Astra satellites and their contribution to developments in the European TV and media industry, was published in April 2010 to mark the 25th anniversary of SES.

Satellites 

Manufacture and launch 
Astra satellites have been designed by Boeing Satellite Systems (formerly Hughes Space and Communications), Airbus Defence and Space (formerly Astrium), Alcatel Space, and Lockheed Martin. The Astra satellites within a family are not identical, for example of the Astra 2 satellites; Astra 2A and Astra 2C are BSS 601HPs, Astra 2B is an Astrium Eurostar E2000+ and Astra 2D is a BSS 376.

The satellites have been launched by Arianespace by Ariane launch vehicles from Kourou, French Guiana, International Launch Services (ILS) Proton launch vehicles from Baikonur, Kazakhstan, and ILS Atlas launch vehicles from Cape Canaveral, Florida, United States. The satellites are launched into an elliptical "temporary transfer orbit" from where they use onboard propulsion to reach their final circular geostationary orbits, at nearly  altitude. Proton launch vehicles fitted with a fourth stage propulsion unit are capable of launching the satellites several thousand kilometres higher (at the closest point of the elliptical orbit) than Ariane launch vehicles. As a result, most satellites launched in this way have to use less fuel to reach their geostationary orbit, increasing their lifetime.

Sirius and Astra 4A 
The Sirius series of satellites (not connected with the North American Sirius Satellite Radio service) was started in 1993 with the purchase of the BSB Marcopolo 1 satellite (renamed Sirius 1) by Nordic Satellite AB (NSAB) for direct to home broadcasts to the Nordic and Baltic regions from the 5°East orbital position. Subsequent satellites launched to this location include Sirius 2 (1997), Sirius 3 (1998) and Sirius 4 (2007) and the position's coverage has been expanded to include Eastern Europe and Africa.

In 2000, SES (then SES Astra) bought the 50% shareholding in NSAB owned by Teracom and Tele Danmark and in 2003 increased that holding to 75%, renaming the company SES Sirius AB. In 2008, Astra acquired further shares to take its shareholding in SES Sirius to 90% and in March 2010 took full control of the company. In June 2010, the affiliate company was renamed SES Astra and the Sirius 4 satellite renamed Astra 4A.

The Astra 4A designation was originally given in 2005 to part of the NSS-10 craft (33 transponders) owned by another subsidiary of SES, SES New Skies, and positioned at 37.5°W for broadcast, data, and telecommunications into Africa, and in 2007 to part of the Sirius 4 satellite (six transponders of the FSS Africa beam) owned and operated by SES Sirius. From June 2010, the Astra 4A designation has applied to the entire satellite previously known as Sirius 4.

Failures 
Astra 1K, the largest commercial communications satellite ever built at the time, was ordered by SES in 1997. It was launched by Proton rocket on 26 November 2002. The launch vehicle lifted off as planned and reached its parking orbit at which point the final stage of the launch vehicle was to initiate a second burn to transfer the satellite to its geostationary orbit. This did not occur and the satellite was released into the parking orbit, making it unusable. The only way to recover the satellite would have been the use of a Space Shuttle, however this was rejected. On 10 December 2002, SES instructed Alcatel Space (the manufacturer) and the French Space Agency CNES to deorbit the satellite, it broke up on re-entry over the Pacific Ocean.

On 16 January 2009, Astra 5A at Astra 31.5°E "experienced a technical anomaly leading to the end of the spacecraft's mission", some four years ahead of the spacecraft's expected end of life. Traffic carried by the satellite (especially channels for German cable service, Kabel Deutschland) was transferred to Astra 23.5°E. In March 2009, SES (then SES Astra) announced that in April, the Astra 2C satellite was to be moved from the Astra 28.2°E position to 31.5°E to temporarily take over Astra 5A's mission until Astra 3B is launched to Astra 23.5°E, when another craft currently there can be released to 31.5°E. The move of Astra 2C was started in May 2009 and completed on 11 May 2009, with the first transponders coming into use at the new position in the subsequent two weeks.

Broadcasting statistics 
At the end of 2021, Astra satellite broadcasts were received in 170 million households in Europe. In Germany, the largest market for Astra broadcasts, 17 million households receive TV via satellite (15.93 million receiving satellite channels in HD) out of 37.22 million TV households (33.76 million HD TV households) in the country with take-up of other TV delivery methods as follows:

See also 

 Astra Digital Radio
 High Above (book)
 HD+
 List of broadcast satellites
 SES Broadband
 MX1
 SES S.A. (operator)
 SES Sirius

References

External links 
 SES fleet information and map
 Official SES site
 SES first maritime Ka-band service
 Lyngsat frequency/channel list
 
 
 
 
  Astra analogue satellite Promo Video clips - Orbitalzone.Com
 SES Broadband website
 SES Techcom Services - Official site

SES S.A.
Telecommunications companies of Luxembourg
Direct broadcast satellite services
Communications satellite operators
Betzdorf, Luxembourg